The 2018 NRL finals series determines the winner of the 2018 National Rugby League season. The series ran over four weekends in September 2018, culminating with the 2018 NRL Grand Final at Sydney's ANZ Stadium on 30 September 2018.

The top eight teams from the 2018 NRL Season qualified for the finals series. NRL finals series have been played under the current format since 2012. The qualifying teams are Melbourne, Sydney, South Sydney, Cronulla-Sutherland, Penrith, Brisbane, St George Illawarra and New Zealand.

Qualification 

Melbourne qualified for their 8th straight finals series. Sydney qualified for their 2nd straight final series. South Sydney qualified for their first finals series since 2015. Cronulla-Sutherland qualified for their 4th straight finals series. Penrith qualified for their 3rd straight finals series. Brisbane qualified for their 5th straight finals series. St George Illawarra qualified for their first finals series since 2015. New Zealand qualified for their first finals series since 2011.

Venues 
The matches of the 2018 NRL finals series were contested at four venues in three different states around the country.

Melbourne's AAMI Park hosted 2 matches, Brisbane's Suncorp Stadium hosted one match and Sydney hosted the remaining 6 matches, which were played at Allianz Stadium and ANZ Stadium.

Finals structure 
The system used for the 2018 NRL finals series was a final eight system. The top four teams in the eight received a "double chance" when they played in week-one qualifying finals, such that if a top-four team lost in the first week it still remained in the finals, playing a semi-final the next week against the winner of an elimination final. The bottom four of the eight played knock-out games – only the winners survived and moved on to the next week. Home-state advantage went to the team with the higher ladder position in the first two weeks, to the qualifying final winners in the third week.

In the second week, the winners of the qualifying finals received a bye to the third week. The losers of the qualifying final played the elimination finals winners in a semi-final. In the third week, the winners of the semi-finals from week two played the winners of the qualifying finals in the first week. The winners of those matches moved on to the grand final at ANZ Stadium in Sydney.

Qualifying & elimination finals

1st qualifying final

1st elimination final

2nd qualifying final

2nd elimination final

Semi-finals

1st semi final

2nd semi final

Preliminary finals

1st preliminary final

2nd preliminary final

Grand final

References

External links

Finals series